The 2019 Dutch Athletics Championships was the national championship in outdoor track and field for the Netherlands. It was held on 25 to 28 July at the Sportpark Laan van Poot in The Hague. It served as the selection meeting for the Netherlands at the 2019 World Championships in Athletics. It was organised by local club Haag Atletiek and Atletiekunie. The long jump competitions were held within the Hague city centre in 25 July while the 10,000 metres took place earlier at the annual Golden Spike Leiden meeting on 8 June.

Results

Men

Women

References

Results
 Uitslagen op Atletiek.nu
 Uitslagen 10.000 m op Atletiek.nu

External links 
 Official website of the Royal Dutch Athletics Federation 

2019
Dutch Athletics Championships
Dutch Championships
Athletics Championships
Sports competitions in The Hague